Lary is a surname, given name, or nickname, and may refer to:

As a surname:

 Al Lary (1928–2001), American baseball player
 Frank Lary (1930-2017), American baseball player
 Lyn Lary (1906–1973), American baseball player
 Yale Lary (1930-2017), American football player, businessman, and politician

As a given or nickname:
Lary (singer), German singer and model
 Lary Sorensen (1955- ), American baseball player

In other uses:
 Los Angeles Railway
Prost=Lary

See also
Larry (disambiguation)
Lari (disambiguation)